Zweihänder Grim & Perilous RPG, generally referred to simply as Zweihänder, is an ENnie award winning tabletop role-playing game published by Grim & Perilous Studios in 2017 following a successful crowdfunding project. As of 2019, the game is published by Andrews McMeel Publishing.

System 
Zweihänder is a dark fantasy tabletop role-playing game that uses percentile dice to resolve choices players and Gamemasters make when playing. Combat in Zweihänder allows human-level creatures and characters to absorb only two or three hits without receiving an "Injury" that may instantly cripple, kill, or permanently maim a character. There are no regeneration or resurrection powers in Zweihänder, and limited healing options are available to players. "Fate Points", which represent a character's fate or destiny, provide a limited number of opportunities to avoid crippling or killing results. "Fortune Points" allow a character to avoid some perilous situations.

Professions 
Characters advance by entering a series of professions that provide access to a series of new or improved skills and bonuses to primary attributes. The profession system reflects the late medieval/early Renaissance setting of the game and gives an idea of what a character might have been doing either before or during their adventures (such as a preacher, coachman, courtier, inquisitor, merchant lord, rat catcher or sellsword).

Awards 
In 2018, Zweihänder won the Gold ENnies award for Best Game and Product of the Year at Gen Con.

Supplements 
 Zweihänder Grim & Perilous RPG, Revised Core Rulebook by Daniel Fox, Andrews McMeel Publishing 2019. 
 Main Gauche, Grim & Perilous Supplement by Daniel Fox, Andrews McMeel Publishing 2019. 
 Zweihänder Grim & Perilous RPG, Player's Handbook by Daniel Fox, Andrews McMeel Publishing 2019. 
 Flames of Freedom, Grim & Perilous RPG by Richard Iorio, Daniel Fox, Dejan Mandic, Ken Duquet, Anna Goldberg, Adam Rose, Elijah Forbes, Gabe Hicks, James Introcaso, Kate Bullock, Sean Van Damme, Tanya DePass, Tanner Yea, TK Johnson, Walt Ciechanowski, Andrews McMeel Publishing 2021. 
 Dark Astral, Grim & Perilous Chapbook by Daniel Fox, Andrews McMeel Publishing 2020. 
 Zweihänder Grim & Perilous RPG, Character's Folio by Daniel Fox, Andrews McMeel Publishing 2020. 
 Zweihänder Grim & Perilous RPG, Gamemaster's Folio by Daniel Fox, Andrews McMeel Publishing 2019. 
 Zweihänder Grim & Perilous RPG, Arcane Magick Cards by Daniel Fox, Andrews McMeel Publishing 2018. 
 Zweihänder Grim & Perilous RPG, Covenant Magick Cards by Daniel Fox, Andrews McMeel Publishing 2017.
 Zweihänder Grim & Perilous RPG, Divine Magick Cards by Daniel Fox, Andrews McMeel Publishing 2018. 
 Zweihänder Grim & Perilous RPG, Gamemaster Screen by Daniel Fox, Andrews McMeel Publishing 2017. 
 Zweihänder Grim & Perilous RPG, Injury & Mishap Cards by Daniel Fox, Andrews McMeel Publishing 2018.
 Zweihänder Grim & Perilous RPG, Monster Cards by Daniel Fox, Andrews McMeel Publishing 2018.

References 

Dark fantasy role-playing games
ENnies winners
Role-playing games introduced in 2017